North Shore Steam Ferry was a trial film using Lumière Cinematographe equipment purchased for the Queensland Department of Agriculture.

Frederick Wills filmed the steam ferry PS Cammeray docking at the Milsons Point Ferry Wharf in 1899. It also shows a worker preparing to receive the ferry as passengers on board ready for disembarkation.

Frederick Wills and Henry Mobsby produced several films using the Lumière Cinematographe that they had purchased for the Queensland Department of Agriculture.

References

1890s Australian films
1899 films
Australian silent short films
Australian black-and-white films
Paddle steamers of Australia
1899 short films
Films set on ships